Holger Braunschweig  is Head and Chair of Inorganic Chemistry at the Julius-Maximilians-University of Würzburg in Würzburg, Germany. He is best known for founding the field of transition metal-boron multiple bonding (transition metal borylenes), the synthesis of the first stable compounds containing boron-boron and boron-oxygen triple bonds, the isolation of the first non-carbon/nitrogen main-group dicarbonyl, and the first fixation of dinitrogen at an element of the p-block of the periodic table. By modifying a strategy pioneered by Prof. Gregory Robinson of the University of Georgia, Braunschweig also discovered the first rational and high-yield synthesis of neutral compounds containing boron-boron double bonds (diborenes). In 2016 Braunschweig isolated the first compounds of beryllium in the oxidation state of zero.

Education and research career
Braunschweig obtained his Ph.D. and Habilitation from RWTH Aachen with P. Paetzold and worked as a postdoctoral researcher with Michael F. Lappert, FRS, at the University of Sussex, Brighton. After two years at Imperial College London as Senior Lecturer and Reader he took up a Chair of Inorganic Chemistry at the Julius-Maximilians-University of Würzburg in 2002, and is now also the founding director of the Institute for Sustainable Chemistry & Catalysis with Boron (ICB).

Professional achievements
In 2009 Braunschweig was awarded the Gottfried Wilhelm Leibniz Prize of the German Research Foundation (DFG) – the highest German-based research prize. He was also awarded the 2014 RSC Main Group Award and the 2016 Alfred Stock Memorial Prize of the German Society of Chemists. He is a Fellow of the Royal Society of Chemistry, a member of the German National Academy of Science (Leopoldina), the Bavarian Academy of Sciences and Humanities, and the North Rhine-Westphalian Academy of Sciences, Humanities and the Arts.

References

External links
 Group research website

21st-century German chemists
1961 births
Living people
Gottfried Wilhelm Leibniz Prize winners
Members of the German Academy of Sciences Leopoldina
Academic staff of the University of Würzburg